is the twentieth single of JPop group Morning Musume and was released November 6, 2003. It sold a total of 145,340 copies, spent 15 weeks in the Japanese top 200 and peaked at number four. The single was certified Gold by the Recording Industry Association of Japan for physical sales of over 100,000 units.

Legacy
The title song was covered in Chinese on Taiwanese Hello! Project group Ice Creamusume's debut mini-album 1st Best!.

Overview
The song was used as the drama Victory! Footgirls no Seishun's theme song. A limited edition was also released coming with sixteen photocards and a M logo photo holder.

Track listings
  – 4:09
 Chorus: Atsuko Inaba, Tsunku, Hiroaki Takeuchi
  – 5:22
 "Go Girl (Koi no Victory) (Instrumental)" – 4:09

Personnel
Kaori Iida – vocals
Natsumi Abe – vocals
Mari Yaguchi – vocals
Rika Ishikawa – vocals
Hitomi Yoshizawa – vocals
Nozomi Tsuji – vocals
Ai Kago – vocals
Ai Takahashi – vocals
Asami Konno – vocals
Makoto Ogawa – vocals
Risa Niigaki – vocals
Miki Fujimoto – vocals
Eri Kamei – vocals
Sayumi Michishige – vocals
Reina Tanaka – vocals
 Tsunku – lyrics and composition
 Hideyuki "Daichi" Suzuki – arrangement, all instruments

Members at time of single
1st generation: Kaori Iida, Natsumi Abe
2nd generation: Mari Yaguchi
4th generation: Rika Ishikawa, Hitomi Yoshizawa, Nozomi Tsuji, Ai Kago
5th generation: Ai Takahashi, Asami Konno, Makoto Ogawa, Risa Niigaki
6th generation: Miki Fujimoto, Eri Kamei, Sayumi Michishige, Reina Tanaka

References

External links
Go Girl (Koi no Victory) at the official Up-Front Works site
Go Girl (Koi no Victory) at Tsunku's official site (with comments)

Morning Musume songs
Zetima Records singles
2003 singles
Japanese television drama theme songs
Song recordings produced by Tsunku
2003 songs
Songs written by Tsunku